The 1996 KAL Cup Korea Open was a men's tennis tournament played on outdoor hard courts at the Seoul Olympic Park Tennis Center in Seoul in South Korea and was part of the World Series of the 1996 ATP Tour. It was the tenth and last edition of the tournament and was held from 22 April through 28 April 1996. First-seeded Byron Black won the singles title.

Finals

Singles

 Byron Black defeated  Martin Damm 7–6(7–3), 6–3
 It was Black's 2nd title of the year and the 14th of his career.

Doubles

 Rick Leach /  Jonathan Stark defeated  Kent Kinnear /  Kevin Ullyett 6–4, 6–4
 It was Leach's 3rd title of the year and the 34th of his career. It was Stark's 1st title of the year and the 17th of his career.

References

External links
 ITF tournament edition details

KAL Cup Korea Open
Seoul Open
1996 Seoul Open